General elections were held in Sweden on 15 September 1991. The Swedish Social Democratic Party remained the largest party in the Riksdag, winning 138 of the 349 seats. However, it was the party's worst showing since 1928 with 37.7% of the vote.

The election was notable due to the rise of a new right-wing populist party named New Democracy which succeeded in securing a parliamentary mandate for the first (and only) time. The four parties of the centre-right coalition (the Centre Party, People's Party, Moderates, and Christian Democrats) were allocated a combined total of 171 seats, 17 more than the two left-wing parties' 154, but still fewer than the 175 necessary for a majority. Thus the centre-right bloc was dependent upon New Democracy to secure a parliamentary majority. It was able to do so, and the Moderates' Carl Bildt became Prime Minister.

One large factor in the shift between the blocs was that the Christian Democrats managed to reach the 4% threshold by a good margin after many previous attempts. This combined with the Green Party falling short of the threshold, meant vast changes to areas yielding wins for the blue bloc. Norrköping, Västerås and Örebro, main urban areas inside the left-wing industrial belt of central Sweden, all voted blue for the first time for generations. Even so, they did only assemble pluralities as opposed to majorities in all three. The centre-right bloc also made vast gains in the capital region, the Moderate Party being the largest both in Stockholm Municipality and the surrounding Stockholm County. Led by the strong Moderate vote, Malmö also flipped to a blue plurality, overturning another historical Social Democrat stronghold.

This election was also famous for the performance of the Donald Duck Party, which collected 1,535 votes, enough to make it the 9th largest in Sweden. The protest party's platform consisted of the demand for "free liquor and wider sidewalks."

Results

Seat distribution

By municipality

References

General elections in Sweden
General
Sweden
Sweden